Satyajit Ray (1921–1992), a Bengali film director from India, is well known for his contributions to Bengali literature. He created two of the most famous characters in Feluda the sleuth, and Professor Shonku the scientist. He wrote several short novels and stories in addition to those based on these two characters. His fiction was targeted mainly at younger readers (mostly teenagers), though it became popular among children and adults alike.

Most of his novels and stories in Bengali have been published by Ananda Publishers, Kolkata; and most of his screenplays have been published in Bengali in the literary journal Ekshan, edited by his close friend Nirmalya Acharya. During the mid-1990s, Ray's film essays and an anthology of short stories were also published in the West. Many of the stories have been translated into English and published.

Feluda stories

Feluda, whose real name is Pradosh Chandra Mitter, is a fictional Kolkata-based private investigator. He is usually accompanied by 2 sidekicks: Topshe (his cousin–Tapesh Ranjan Mitra) and Lalmohan Ganguly, usually described as Lalmohan Babu (who himself writes with the pseudonym of Jatayu), a bumbling writer of crime fiction.
Satyajit Ray wrote thirty-five Feluda stories, most of which were extremely popular, and made into films two of the Feluda stories–Sonar Kella (The Golden Fortress) (1974) and Joi Baba Felunath (The Elephant God) (1978).

Professor Shonku stories

Professor Trilokeshwar Shonku (Professor Shonku), is a fictional scientist and inventor appearing in a series of science-fiction stories and books. He lives in Giridih beside the river Usri. He has a male servant named Prahllad and a cat named Newton living in the house. He was a child prodigy, and achieved several academic distinctions. He has his own laboratory in his house where he does research for many new and fantastic inventions. He has many scientist allies, like Jeremy Saunders, Wilhelm Kroll, and John Summerville. He has a neighbor, Abinash Chandra Majumdar, who makes fun of his inventions, but are nevertheless good friends. Along with Abinashbabu, he also has a friend named Nakur Chandra Biswas, a man who is gifted with supernatural powers and skills. He is world-renowned for the armory of these diverse inventions. The adventures of Professor Shonku are set in several countries throughout the world.

 Professor Shonku New Script, Calcutta 1965.
 Professor Shonkur Kandokarkhana (Professor Shonku's Deeds). Ananda Publishers, Calcutta 1970.
 Shabash Professor Shonku (Bravo Professor Shonku). Ananda Publishers, Calcutta 1974.
 Mahasankatey Shonku (Shonku in Deep Peril). Ananda Publishers, Calcutta 1977.
 Swayang Professor Shonku (None other than Professor Shonku). Ananda Publishers, Calcutta 1980.
 Shonku Ekai Aksho (Shonku, All in All). Ananda Publishers, Calcutta 1983.
 Punashcha Professor Shonku (Shonku once again). Ananda Publishers, Calcutta 1993.
 Selam Professor Shonku (Hats off, Professor Shonku). Ananda Publishers, Calcutta, 1995.
 Shonku Samagra (Complete Shonku collection) Ananda Publishers, Kolkata January 2002,

Tarini khuro stories

Tarini khuro (Tarini Uncle)is an aged bachelor (khuro is an old Bengali term meaning uncle) who can tell interesting stories based on his weird experiences. Many of these stories border on being horror stories or spooky stories, while some of the stories depict the smartness and quick wit of Tarini khuro.

Bankubabur Bandhu

Bankubabur Bandhu (Banku Babu's Friend or Mr. Banku's Friend) was a Bengali science fiction story Ray had written in 1962 for Sandesh, the Ray family magazine, which gained popularity among Bengalis in the early 1960s. What differentiated Bankubabur Bandhu from previous science fiction was the portrayal of an alien from outer space as a kind and playful being, invested with magical powers and capable of interacting with children, in contrast to earlier science fiction works which portrayed aliens as dangerous creatures.

Several science fiction films were inspired by the story, including Rakesh Roshan's Koi... Mil Gaya, which itself inspired the Indonesian television series Si Yoyo. Ray believed that Steven Spielberg’s E.T. the Extra-Terrestrial was also inspired by the story, though Spielberg has said that it was not. The story of Bankubabur Bandhu itself was eventually adapted into a television film by Satyajit's son Sandip Ray alongside Kaushik Sen in 2006.

Other short stories
Satyajit Ray penned many  short stories not based on any famous characters. These stories, which used to be published as collections of twelve stories, were mostly urbane, and were very unassuming until the last line or last paragraph where suddenly a new revelation left the reader amazed. Many of these stories dealt with the way trivial incidents change the course of one's life, while some other stories were chilling horror stories. The language of the stories was very straightforward and lucid.

Ray also translated some short stories (mostly adventure stories) from English and a collection of stories named Braziler Kalo Bagh was published. He also translated Ray Bradbury's 'Third Expedition' from Martian Chronicles as 'Mongol-i Shorgo'(Mars is Heaven).

Other books
 Ekei Bole Shooting 
 Apur Panchali 
 Toray Bandha Ghorar Dim
 Mollah Nasiruddin-er Galpo
 Brazil-er kalo bagh
 Pikoor Diary O Onnanyo
 Jakhon Chhoto Chilam
 Sujon harbola
 Protikriti
 Bishoy Chalochitro
 Our Films Their Films
 kanchonjongha (film script)
 Nayak (film script)
 Sakhaprosakha (film script)
 My Years with Apu: A Memoir
 Deep Focus

12 Series
 Ek Dozon Gappo
 Aaro Ek Dozon
 Aaro Baro
 Ebaro Baro
 Bah! Baro
 Eker Pithe Dui
 Jobor Baro

Short stories
 Pterodactyl-er Dim (The Pterodacyl's Egg)
 Bonkubabu'r Bondhu (Bonku Babu's Friend)
 Septopuser Khide (The Hungry Septopus)
 Nil Atanka (Indigo)
 Badur Bibhishika (The Vicious Vampire)
 Master Angshuman
 Anko Sir, Golapi Babu O Tipu (The Math Teacher, Mr Pink and Tipu)
 Fritz
 Shibu O Rakkhos-er Katha (The Tale of Shibu and the Monster)
 Spotlight
 Rontu'r Dadu (Rontu's Grandfather)
 Sujon Harbola
 Raton O Lokkhi
 Pikoo'r Diary (Pikoo's Diary)
 Mayurkonthi Jelly
 Arjosekhor-er Janmo O Mrityu (The Life and Death of Aryashekhar)
 Kaagtaruya (The Scarecrow)
 Bahuroopi (Chameleon)
 Sahodeb Babu'r Portrait (Sahadev Babu's Portrait)
 Brown Saheb-er Baari (Mr. Brown's Cottage)
 Sadananda-er Khude Jogot (The Small World of Sadananda)
 Professor Hiji-bij-bij
 Baatik Babu (Mr Eccentric)
 Bhakto (The Admirer)
 Bishful
 Load Shedding
 Anathbabu'r Bhoy (Anath Babu's Terror)
 Mr. Shasmol-er Shesh Raatri (A Strange Night for Mr Shasmal)
 Pintu'r Dadu (Pintu's Grandfather)
 Chilekotha (The Attic)
 Bhuto
 Ami Bhut (I Am a Ghost)
 Atithi (Stranger)
 First Class Kamra
 Dhappa
 Maanpatro (The Citation)
 Apodartho (Worthless)
 McKenzie Fruit
 Sadhon Babu'r Sandeho (Sadhan Babu's Suspicions)
 Lakhpoti (The Millionaire)
 Needhiram-er Ichchha Puron (A Dream Come True)
 Kanayi-er Kathaa
 Gangaram-er Kapaal
 Nitai O Mahapurush (Nitai and the Holy Man)
 Hauee
 Protikriti
 Norris Shaheb-er Bungalow
 Kutum-Katam
 Ganesh Mutshuddi'r Portrait
 Notun Bondhu
 Shishu Saahityik
 Mohim Sanyal-er Ghatona
 Nitai Babu'r Moina
 Sahojaatri
 Dui Bondhu (The Promise)
 Shilpi 2000
 Akshay Babu'r Shiksha
 Proshonna Sir
 Abhiraam
 Sobuj Manush
 Khagam

Anthologies
 Golpo 101 (One Hundred and One Stories)
 Sera Satyajit (Best of Satyajit)
 Aro Satyajit (More stories by Satyajit)
 Feluda Samagra 1 & 2
 Shanku Samagra
 Prabandha Sangraha

Poetry
Satyajit Ray translated and wrote some limericks that were published in a collection–Toray Bandha Ghorar Dim (A bunch of Horse-Eggs!). He was also the translator of Lewis Carrol's Jabberwocky. In translation the poem is renamed 'Joborkhaki'.

Mullah Nasiruddin
A collection of very short stories based on Mullah Nasiruddin (a fictional character from the Middle East known for his witty and comic character) was collected by Satyajit Ray and published as Mullah Nasiruddiner Galpo (Stories of Mullah Nasiruddin).

Fatik Chand
Fatik Chand  is a dramatic mystery about the adventures of a kidnapped Calcutta schoolboy, written in Bengali. The book was made into a film in 1983 entitled Phatik Chand.

Others
Sujan Harbola (Sujan the Mimic) is a collection of fables. Ekei Bole Shooting is a collection of Satyajit Ray's experiences and reflections during the making of his films. Jakhon Choto Chilam is a memoir dealing with his childhood days. Our Films, Their Films is an anthology of film criticism. Bishoy Chalachitro is another book by Ray on films.

By Satyajit Ray

General

Individual films
Apu Trilogy

Explanatory notes

References

Bibliography

External links
 
 SatyajitRay.org
 Satyajit Ray Film and Study Center: University of California - Santa Cruz
 Satyajit Ray society
 Scarecrow by Satyajit Ray

Ray, Satyajit
Bengali-language literature
Satyajit Ray